Incheon Science High School (인천과학고등학교:仁川科學高等學校) is located in the Incheon Metropolitan Area
(인천광역시), Incheon Jung-Gu (인천중구), Young Jong main street, number 277 street 74-37 (Unseo-dong:운서동 543-4) street address.  

Incheon Science High School is a magnet school, so the graduates of the school usually go to science and engineering colleges (Seoul National University, Postech, KAIST, Hanyang University, Korea University, Yonsei University, other prestigious universities in Korea and throughout the world, and also medical schools in Korea).

History
 19 August 1993: Official permission of Incheon Science High School foundation
 1 March 1994: Inauguration of InCheol Kim as the first principal
 3 March 1994: First entrance ceremony
 26 September 1994: Moved to a newly built school
 21 April 1995: Set up a sisterhood relationship with Samsung Electronics MicroCenter
 1 November 1996: Completion of school LAN
 1 September 1997: Building the Internet computer network
 1 September 2001: Inauguration of GyuHo Jo as the second principal
 1 April 2003: Work begun on official residence
 24 October 2003: Extending an electronic library
 2 March 2004: Eleventh entrance ceremony
 2 December 2006: Extending a study hall on main building fourth floor
 15 February 2007: Eleventh graduation ceremony
 11 August 2007: Set up a sisterhood relationship with JangSa 26 middle school in Hunan Province, China
 1 March 2008: Inauguration of YongSeop An as the third principal

Introduction

Purpose of establishment
 Early detection of scientific aptitude and development of potential ability
 Establishing the foundation of making high ranked scientific staff
 Inducement of choosing Natural sciences and engineering career for talented students

Object of education
 JaJu (자주, independence): independent people
 ChangUi (창의, creative): creative people
 DeokSeong (덕성, virtue): virtuous people

Symbol of the school
 School tree: Pinus thunbergii (곰솔)
 School flower: Rose
인곽 오지마 진짜 제발

Buildings
The school contains a Main building, an Outbuilding, Cheong Un Gwan (청운관 : Dormitory), Cheong Myeong Gwan (청명관 : Dormitory), and a cafeteria. Because all buildings are connected by an arcade, movement between buildings is out of the rain.

Main building
The main building has four floors. The classrooms for first- and second-year students and main school works are finished.
 On the first floor are the principal's office, administrative office, advisors' and superintendent's offices, mathematics classroom, assembly hall, workshop, audiovisual room, and the Physics Olympiad room. The lobby is located in the center. Beside it are a weight room and a table tennis room.
 On the second floor, there are four classrooms for first-year students, the first-year student teachers' room, lab, earth science laboratory, an admission officer's room, and a polarizing microscope room.
 On the third floor, there are four classrooms for second-year students, the second-year student teachers' room, library, computer room, audio/visual laboratory, and an outdated study hall. Also, the third floor is connected by a passage to the cafeteria and outbuilding.
 On the roof, there is an astronomical observatory.

Outbuilding
The outbuilding has four floors. There are classrooms for third-year students (also used for Gifted and Talented Education [GATE] classes) and a room for science experiments. 

 On the first floor there are the GATE office and three classrooms for third-year students.
 On the second floor are a chemical laboratory, lab and chemicals room.
 On the third floor are a physical laboratory, lab and seminar room.
 On fourth floor are a biologic laboratory, lab and microscope room.

Cheong Un Gwan (청운관)
This dormitory has three floors. The coed dorm is located in the same building, but the dormitories are separated by walls. 1-2 people live in each room. Each room has two beds with a shared restroom, washroom, and shower. Most residents are juniors, but almost twelve students are freshmen.

Cheong Myeong Gwan (청명관)
This building was built in 2009. Since November 2, all female students and some male students live in this dormitory. 2-4 people live in each room. Each room has a rest room and four beds. Only freshmen live in the building.

Cafeteria
The cafeteria is composed of two halls. Both halls were used for special lunch time, but special lunch time has been eliminated, so now only one hall is used. Each hall has two Food Distribution counters and one station to return used utensils.

Club activity
There are four types of clubs. In there students must join each study club, Olympiad club, interest club.

Study clubs
 WIN (physics research club)
 Plutonium (robot engineering club)
 TNT (chemical experiment club)
 LOTTOL (biochemistry research club)
 Bandy (biology research club)
 Quasar (astronomical observation club)
 SaRamGwa SemTeur (사람과 셈틀, computer research club)
 Logic (logical mathematics club)
 Criticism (logical criticism club)

Olympiad clubs
 Wizard (Olympiad in Informatics club)
 CheonSuDong (천수동, Mathematics Olympiad club)
 TIP (Physics Olympiad club)
 Philochem (Chemistry Olympiad club)
 Think Big (Biology Olympiad club)
 Meteor (Earth Science Olympiad club)

Interest clubs
 GLOBE (aeroscopy club)
 Buzzer Bitter (basketball club)
 Red Devils (soccer club)
 Fusion Entertainment (dance club)
 YeoHwaMuGa (여화무가, theater club)
 ChaRang (차랑, group sound)
 BiRyong (비룡, cooking club)
 iFlow (hiphop club)

Other clubs
 YeoDiDiYa (여디디야, Christianity club)
 ASeoHwaRang (아서화랑, librarian club)
 Web Master (school website editor club)
 HaYanNoRae (하얀노래, a cappella club)
 School paper editing club
 Newspaper editing club
 KaJak (카작, Catholic club)
 ISBN (broadcasting club)
 AMABILE (chamber music club)

See also
 Seoul Science High School
 Hansung Science High School
 Daegu Science High School

External links 
 official site

Science high schools in South Korea
Schools in Incheon
Jung District, Incheon
Educational institutions established in 1994
1994 establishments in South Korea